The Chung Wah Middle School was a leftist school located at 1 Chico Terrace, Mid-Levels, Hong Kong. It opened in 1926 and was shut down by the Hong Kong Government for its involvement in the 1967 riots. Following the 1997 Handover, some alumni of the school went on to serve as high-ranking officials in the new government.

History
The school was founded by Wong Lan-koon, a grandfather of Elsie Leung.

The police raided the school on 16 October 1967. They seized more than 3,500 inflammatory posters.

On 27 November 1967 two explosions were reported at the school, and a student was seriously injured in the school laboratory. Area residents and police alleged that the school was being used as an improvised explosive device factory. The injured student, 18-year-old Siu Wai-man, lost part of his left hand. He was charged with possession of explosive substances and sentenced to four years in prison.

The day after the explosions, four other Communist schools were raided by police for suspected bomb-making, namely the Heung To Middle School, Hon Wah Middle School, Fukien Middle School, and the Mongkok Workers' Children School.

The school was immediately closed by the government following the explosions. In mid-1968 the government de-registered the school under the Education Ordinance on the grounds that it had been "willfully used for the unlawful manufacture and storage of dangerous explosive substances".

In late 1968 it was reported in the South China Morning Post that all former students of Chung Wah Middle School had transferred to Hon Wah Middle School.

Notable alumni
 Elsie Leung – the first Secretary for Justice of the HKSAR
 Tung Chee-hwa – the first Chief Executive of the HKSAR

See also
 List of secondary schools in Hong Kong

References

1967 Hong Kong riots
Mid-Levels
Secondary schools in Hong Kong
Communist schools in Hong Kong
Defunct schools in Hong Kong